The Muslim Rashtriya  Manch (MRM; translation: Muslim National Forum)  is a Muslim organisation in India, inspired by the Hindu nationalist Rashtriya Swayamsevak Sangh (RSS). It was formed in 2002 in the presence of the then RSS chief K.S. Sudarshan to grow dialogue with Muslim community.

Ideology and activism
The MRM was founded with the stated aim of bringing  Muslim communities close to Hindus in India. It states that Muslim suspicions of the RSS and its affiliates are misplaced, and that the Indian National Congress is responsible for leadership within the Muslim community. The MRM has also expressed support for many of the causes espoused by the RSS, including the banning of cow-slaughter. Its national convener, Mohammed Afzal, stated that the organisation faced significant resistance in the days following the Godhra train burning and the 2002 Gujarat riots.

In November 2009 the Jamiat Ulema-e-Hind, one of the largest Islamic organisations in India, passed a resolution describing Vande Mataram as an un-Islamic song. The MRM expressed opposition to the resolution. Afzal stated "Our Muslim brothers should not follow the fatwa as Vande Mataram is the national song of the country and every Indian citizen should respect and recite it." The MRM stated further that Muslims who refused to sing it were opponents of both Islam and India.  In August 2008, MRM organised a Paigham-e-Aman (message of peace) yatra from the Red Fort in Delhi to Kashmir in support of land allocation for the Amarnath pilgrimage. Led by the Jharkhand Shahee-Imam Moulana Hizb Rehman Merthi, the 50 activists of the yatra were initially stopped at the border of Jammu & Kashmir. They were later allowed to go to Jammu where they held meetings with the Shri Amarnath Sangharsh Samiti.
 In November 2009, the MRM organised a tiranga yatra (march in honour of the national flag) leading to the Gateway of India in Mumbai, protesting against terrorism. One thousand volunteers took a pledge against terror and vowed to campaign against it in their home districts. In September 2012, the MRM organised a signature campaign to revoke Article 370 of the Indian Constitution, which grants limited autonomy to the state of Jammu and Kashmir, and claimed to have collected 700,000 signatures.
	
In the 2014 general election, the MRM campaigned for Bharatiya Janata Party candidate Narendra Modi. Afzal stated that the MRM would attempt to reach out to 50 million Muslims before the election. When questioned about Modi's involvement in the Gujarat riots, Afzal stated:

The Manch expressed its views that 'Yoga' does not have anything to do with religion, further stating that "Namaaz is one sort of Yoga asana". The move was supported by the Union Ministry of Ayurveda, Yoga and Naturopathy, Unani, Siddha and Homoeopathy (AYUSH) but Hindu groups expressed reservations.

See also

 Sangh Parivar
 Bharatiya Janata Party
 Rashtriya Swayamsevak Sangh (RSS)
 Rashtriya Sikh Sangat

References

Further reading
 

2002 establishments in India
Islamic organisations based in India
Organisations based in Delhi
Sangh Parivar
Islamic organizations established in 2002